Tom Pajic is an American football coach and administrator.  He served as the head coach at Quincy University in Quincy, Illinois from 2012 to 2016, compiling a career record of 19–35.

Pajic was a senior offensive analyst for the Temple University football team in 2018.

Head coaching record

References

External links
 Temple profile

Year of birth missing (living people)
Living people
Bloomsburg Huskies football coaches
Bloomsburg Huskies football players
Fordham Rams football coaches
Gettysburg Bullets football coaches
Hofstra Pride football coaches
Missouri State Bears football coaches
Quincy Hawks football coaches
Temple Owls football coaches
Wilkes Colonels football coaches